At least two ships of the Hellenic Navy have borne the name Delfin :

  a submarine launched in 1912 and scrapped in 1920.
  a V-class submarine launched as HMS Vengeful in 1944 she was renamed on transfer to Greece in 1945. She was scrapped in 1958.

Hellenic Navy ship names